The United States Revenue Act of 1951 temporarily increased individual income tax rates through 1953, and temporarily raised corporate tax rates 5 percentage points through March 31, 1954.

Excise taxes on alcohol, tobacco, gasoline, and automobiles were also temporarily increased through March 31, 1954.

External links
 Full text of the Act

United States federal taxation legislation
1951 in law
82nd United States Congress
United States federal legislation articles without infoboxes